Pirkey is an unincorporated community in Greene County, Virginia, United States.

References
GNIS reference

Mennonitism in Virginia
Palatine German settlement in Virginia
Unincorporated communities in Greene County, Virginia
Unincorporated communities in Virginia